Taebaek is a city in Gangwon province, South Korea. Its name is shared with that of the Taebaek Mountains.

Attractions
Manggyeongsa Temple in Hyeol-dong, at an elevation of 1,460 meters on the Taebaek Mountains, is a temple built to enshrine the statue of the Bodhisattva of wisdom. It was built by Jajang, a Silla Dynasty monk. The "Dragon Spring" at the entrance of the temple is known as the highest spring in Korea.

Climate

Sister cities

 Helong, Jilin, China since August 29, 1995
 Baguio, Philippines since April 25, 2006
 Suzhou, Jiangsu, China since March 8, 2005
 Gao'an, Jiangxi, China since June 23, 2004
 Changchun, Jilin, China since January 18, 2006

See also
List of cities in South Korea
List of highest towns by country

References

External links
Taebaek city government home page

 
Cities in Gangwon Province, South Korea